
Drift seeds (also sea beans) and drift fruits are seeds and fruits adapted for long-distance dispersal by water.  Most are produced by tropical trees, and they can be found on distant beaches after drifting thousands of miles through ocean currents.  This method of propagation has helped many species of plant such as the coconut colonize and establish themselves on previously barren islands. Consequently, drift seeds and fruits are of interest to scientists who study these currents.

In botanical terminology, a drift fruit is a kind of diaspore, and drift seeds and fruits are disseminules.

Sources of drift seeds 

 Caesalpinia bonduc – grey nickernut
 Caesalpinia major – yellow nickernut
 Carapa guianensis – crabwood (New World tropics)
 Entada gigas – seaheart, (New World tropics)
 Entada rheedii – snuff box sea bean, from the tropics of the Indian Ocean
 Erythrina fusca – bucayo (pantropical)
 Erythrina variegata – tiger claw (Old World tropics)
 Mucuna spp. – ox-eye bean, hamburger seed, deer-eye bean
 Ormosia spp. – horse-eye bean, from the tropics
 Terminalia catappa – tropical almond, from the tropics of Asia

Sources of drift fruits
 Barringtonia asiatica – box fruit, from Polynesia
 Cocos nucifera – coconut, from the tropics
 Grias cauliflora – anchovy pear, from the tropics of the Americas
 Heritiera littoralis – puzzle fruit, from Southeast Asia
 Lodoicea maldivica – coco de mer, from the Seychelles
 Manicaria saccifera – sea coconut,  from South America
 Pandanus spp. – screw pines, from the Old World tropics

Research
Enthusiasts founded an annual convention in 1996, the International Sea-bean Symposium, dedicated to the display, study, and dissemination of information concerning drift seeds and other flotsam.

References

External links

 

Plant morphology
Plant reproduction
Ocean currents